Brian Darrell "Luke" Brookshier (born August 31, 1971) is an American animator, storyboard artist, screenwriter, and director known for his work on Nickelodeon's SpongeBob SquarePants and he was nominated for an Emmy Award for "Outstanding Animated Program" for writing the SpongeBob SquarePants episode "Wigstruck".
 After SpongeBob, Brookshier went on to work as writer and storyboard artist in the first season of Cartoon Network's Uncle Grandpa. He studied animation at the California Institute of Arts. He was also a storyboard artist for the animated series Kim Possible  and worked on the character layout for King of the Hill. He also had one of his shows turned into a Golden Book: Mr FancyPants!. He storyboarded the Gravity Falls episode, "The Hand that Rocks the Mabel" and the Wabbit episode, "Sun Valley Freeze".

Television 
1995: The Maxx (TV Mini Series) - Character Layout Artist, As Brian Brookshier
1997-1998: 101 Dalmatians: The Series - Prop Design, Storyboard Revisions
1998-1999: Hercules - Prop Design
2000–2001: Buzz Lightyear of Star Command -  Prop Design,  Character Designer, Additional Character Designer, Key Location Designer, As Brian Brookshier
2000–2002: Mission Hill - Character Layout Artist
2001–2002: House of Mouse - Prop Design
2004: Kim Possible - Storyboard Artist
2005: The X's - Storyboard Revisionist
2005–2013; 2017–present: SpongeBob SquarePants - Writer, Storyboard Director, Animation Writer, Character Designer, Songwriter, Story Editor
2012: Gravity Falls - Storyboard Artist
2013–2014: Uncle Grandpa - Writer, Storyboard Artist
2015: Wabbit - Storyboard Artist
2015–2016: Pig Goat Banana Cricket - Director
2017: Billy Dilley's Super-Duper Subterranean Summer -  Writer, Storyboard Artist
2021: Kamp Koral: SpongeBob's Under Years - Co-Developer, Staff Writer, Theme Song By
2021: The Patrick Star Show - Co-Creator, Co-Developer, Writer

Film 
2000: Buzz Lightyear of Star Command: The Adventure Begins - Character Designer, As Brian Brookshier
2000: Thrillseekers: Putt n' Perish - Character Designer, Layout Artist, As Brian Brookshier
2003: Looney Tunes: Back in Action - Rough Inbetweener
2009: Square Roots: The Story of SpongeBob SquarePants - Documentary, Himself
2009: SpongeBob's Truth or Square - Writer, Storyboard Director, Songwriter
2015: The SpongeBob Movie: Sponge Out of Water - Storyboard Artist
2020: SpongeBob Appreciation Day: Patchy's Beach Bash! - Writer
2021: Tom & Jerry  - Character Designer

Video Games 
2000: Sabrina: The Animated Series - Zapped! - Additional Artist
2001: Sabrina: The Animated Series - Spooked! - Backgrounds
2001: WWF Betrayal - Artist, Character Animator
2001: Wendy: Every Witch Way - Additional Artist
2002: Shantae - Additional Character Animator
2002: The Scorpion King: Sword of Osiris - Artist, Enemy and Boss Animator
2002: Godzilla: Domination! - Character Animator, Illustrations
2004: Ping Pals - Additional Artist
2006: SpongeBob SquarePants: Creature from the Krusty Krab (Nintendo DS version) - Storyboard Artist, Prop Design
2007: Looney Tunes: Duck Amuck - Writer, Storyboard Artist
2011: SpongeBob SquigglePants - Writer

References

External links

American male screenwriters
American storyboard artists
American television directors
American television writers
Living people
American male television writers
1971 births